The  atoC RNA motif is a conserved RNA-like structure identified by bioinformatics.  It consistently appears upstream of protein-coding gene that are predicted to encode oxidoreductase activity, dihydropteroate synthase (part of folate metabolism) or DNA-binding response regulators.

References

External links
 

Cis-regulatory RNA elements